Karen Knox is a Canadian director, actor, and writer.  She is the show runner of Slo Pitch, and Homeschooled on CBC, which she wrote, directed, and starred in.  Her directorial feature film debut, Adult Adoption, premiered at the 2022 Glasgow Film Festival prior to its theatrical release in North America with Level Film. Knox's notable roles include Ginger in Paramount's All I Didn't Want opposite Academy Award nominee Gabourey Sidibe, Holly Frost in Syfy's Letters to Satan Claus, Veronica Vale in KindaTV's Barbelle, and Boris in IFC (American TV channel) Slo Pitch.

Early life 
Karen Knox was born and raised in Orangeville, Ontario. She later moved to Toronto to pursue a career in acting. Knox is a graduate of the London Academy of Music and Dramatic Art.

Career 
Knox was the show runner for KindaTV's Barbelle, IFC's Slo Pitch, and CBC's Homeschooled, which she also wrote, directed, and appeared in.

Knox's feature film directorial debut Adult Adoption (written by and starring Ellie Moon) completed production in early 2021 and was acquired for distribution by levelFILM. The film had its premiere at the Glasgow Film Festival in 2022, where it received positive reviews.  

In November 2022, Knox entered production on her second feature film We Forgot to Break Up, an adaptation of Kayt Burgess's novel Heidegger Stairwell which was previously adapted as a short film by Chandler Levack in 2017.

Knox has written and directed several shorts with her company Boss & Co which have toured to festivals around the world, including Borderline which premiered at Dances With Films in 2022, and Case of the Massey Bodice Ripping which screened at the Canadian Film Festival in 2019.   Knox co-wrote and starred in the short film Cons & Pros, alongside Gwenlyn Cumyn, which debuted on Vice in January 2020.

As an actor, Knox has had roles in Frankie Drake Mysteries, Save Me, Slo Pitch, and Murdoch Mysteries. Knox voices the character Shaid in Ubisoft's Starlink: Battle for Atlas.  In 2015, Knox appeared in the world premiere of the John Patrick Shanley play, A Woman is a Secret.

Filmography

References 

21st-century Canadian actresses
Living people
Year of birth missing (living people)
Film directors from Ontario
Actresses from Ontario
People from Orangeville, Ontario
Canadian women film directors
Canadian film actresses
Canadian television actresses
Canadian web series actresses